The Titans du Cégep Limoilou represent Cégep Limoilou and are a women's ice hockey team that compete in the Hockey collégial féminin RSEQ. The team plays its home games in l’Arpidrome de Charlesbourg.

History
The Titans were created in 1999 and played their first season in autumn 2000. The team had 2 consecutive provincial championships. In the Coupe Dodge 2009, the Titans du Cégep Limoilou won a bronze medal in a 4-0 victory over Collège Lafleche. Lisa-Marie L'Heureux had five goals and four assists for nine points during the postseason. For the season, she scored 21 goals and had 12 assists for 33 points in only 24 games. Her 33 points ranked seventh in the Ligue de hockey féminin collégial AA among all scorers but first among all league defenders. In addition, her 33 points led the team.

Championship playoff 
Following the regular season, a playoff is held to determine the Collégial women's champion in Quebec. A list of collégial winners includes (winner is in bold):

Playoff 2011-12

First round

Semi-finals and Championship Final game 2011-12

Playoff 2010-11
The semi-finals and the finals was presented at the Centre Étienne Desmarteau

winner: Patriotes du Cégep St-Laurent

Playoff 2009-10
Semi-finals and Championship Final game 2010

winner: Lynx du Collège Édouard-Montpetit

Playoffs 2008-09
Semi-finals and Championship Final game

winner:Lynx du Collège Édouard-Montpetit

Awards and honors
 Joannie Lebrun, Goaltender, Collegial AA First Team All-Star, 2010–11
 Emmanuelle Dumont, Forward, Collegial AA Second Team All-Star, 2010–11
 Emmanuelle Dumont, Collegial AA Sportsmanship Award, 2010–11
 Emmanuelle Dumont, Collegial AA Academic All-Star, 2010–11
 Joannie Lebrun, Goaltender, Collegial AA First Team All-Star, 2010–11
 Vanessa Laplante, Defense, Collegial AA First Team All-Star, 2009–10
 Emmanuelle Dumont, Forward, Collegial AA Second Team All-Star, 2009–10
 Marie-Andrée Marchand, Goaltender, Collegial AA Second Team All-Star, 2009–10
 Emmanuelle Dumont, Collegial AA Sportsmanship Award, 2009–10
 Raphaelle Cardinal, Collegial AA Academic All-Star, 2009–10
 Lisa-Marie L’Heureux, Defense, Collegial AA First Team All-Star, 2008–09
Emmanuelle Dumont, Forward, Collegial AA First Team All-Star, 2008–09
Marie-Hélène Suc, Defense, Collegial AA First Team All-Star, 2008–09
Raphaëlle Cardinal, Collegial AA Academic All-Star, 2008–09

Current roster 2011-12

Coaching staff 2011-12 

    Head Coach:   	Pascal Dufresne
    Assistant Coach: Alex dubois
    Assistant Coach:  Sébastien Guérin
    Assistant Coach: Emmanuelle Dumont

References

See also
 Hockey collégial féminin RSEQ
 Coupe Dodge

Women's ice hockey teams in Canada
Amateur ice hockey
Youth ice hockey
Ice hockey teams in Quebec City
Ice hockey clubs established in 1999
1999 establishments in Quebec
Women in Quebec